Braden Smith (born March 25, 1996) is an American football offensive tackle for the Indianapolis Colts of the National Football League (NFL). He played college football at Auburn.

High school career
A native of Olathe, Kansas, Smith attended Olathe South High School, where he was a two-way lineman on the football varsity. Smith was credited with 82 pancake blocks on offense, 59 tackles on defense in his senior season.

Regarded as a four-star recruit by ESPN, Smith was ranked as the No. 9 offensive guard prospect in the class of 2014. He had offers from Alabama, Texas A&M, Georgia and Notre Dame, and decided to commit to Auburn University on May 27, 2014.

College career
Smith played as a freshman playing in 12 games. In his sophomore season at Auburn, he played right guard and was named Second-team All-SEC. Smith received All-America honors in both 2016 and 2017 as well as received the Jacobs Blocking Trophy for the best blocker in the SEC in 2017. He finished his collegiate career with 41 starts in four seasons.

Professional career

Smith was drafted by the Indianapolis Colts in the second round, 37th overall, of the 2018 NFL Draft. He was named the starting right tackle in Week 5, and started the final 12 games, as well as both games in the playoffs.

Smith was placed on the reserve/COVID-19 list by the team on December 25, 2020, and activated on December 30.

On July 28, 2021, Smith signed a four-year, $72.4 million contract extension with the Colts.

References

External links
Auburn Tigers bio
Indianapolis Colts bio

1996 births
Living people
Sportspeople from Olathe, Kansas
Players of American football from Kansas
American football offensive guards
American football offensive tackles
Auburn Tigers football players
Indianapolis Colts players